Ambulyx liturata is a species of moth of the family Sphingidae first described by Arthur Gardiner Butler in 1875.

Distribution 
It is found from Nepal, the north-eastern India states of Sikkim and Assam, Myanmar, Thailand and Vietnam to Fujian and Hong Kong in China.

Description 
The wingspan is 106–134 mm. It is similar to Ambulyx maculifera, but can be distinguished by the absence of a subbasal costal patch on the forewing upperside.

Biology 
The larvae have been recorded feeding on Canarium album in China.

References

Ambulyx
Moths described in 1875
Moths of Asia